Budarsingi is a village in Dharwad district of Karnataka, India.

Demographics
As of the 2011 Census of India there were 232 households in Budarsingi and a total population of 1,194 consisting of 637 males and 557 females. There were 177 children ages 0-6.

References

Villages in Dharwad district